Sound Theories Vol. I & II is a 2007 album by American guitarist Steve Vai. The album was recorded with the Metropole Orchestra in Netherlands in mid-2004/2005 and released on June 26, 2007.

Volume I features Vai playing guitar with the orchestra, which has itself earned worldwide acclaim by backing artists ranging from Mike Keneally, Terry Bozzio, Tony Bennett and Natalie Cole to Nancy Wilson and the Yellowjackets. Volume II features the Orchestra performing compositions written by Vai, including "Shadows and Sparks" and "Bledsoe Bluvd."

Track listing
All songs written by Steve Vai.

Disc One - Sound Theories Vol 1: "The Aching Hunger"
 "Kill the Guy with the Ball"  - 4:30
 "The God Eaters" - 2:09
 "The Murder Prologue" - 1:09
 "The Murder" - 7:56
 "Gentle Ways" - 5:48
 "Answers" - 5:44
 "I'm Becoming" - 2:20
 "Salamanders in the Sun" - 5:05
 "Liberty" - 2:06
 "The Attitude Song" - 4:37
 "For the Love of God" - 9:35

Disc Two - Sound Theories Vol 2: "Shadows and Sparks"
 "Shadows and…" - 8:41
 "Sparks"  - 9:27
 "Frangelica Pt. I" - 3:04
 "Frangelica Pt. II" - 10:30
 "Helios and Vesta" - 8:19
 "Bledsoe Bluvd" - 10:08

DVD
A companion DVD titled Visual Sound Theories was released through Epic/Sony on September 18, 2007. This DVD features the live performances from the Aching Hunger concerts with the Holland Metropole Orchestra in July 2005.

The DVD includes 14 tracks in both stereo and 5.1 surround sound:

 Kill The Guy With The Ball
 The God Eaters
 The Murder Prologue
 The Murder
 Answers
 Lotus Feet
 I'm Becoming
 Salamanders In The Sun
 The Attitude Song
 Gentle Ways
 Liberty
 For the Love of God
 Shadows And Sparks
 Frangelica Pt. I & II

Charts

References

External links
 Steve Vai's homepage
 Steve Vai's Official MySpace

Steve Vai albums
2007 live albums
2007 video albums
Live video albums
Live instrumental rock albums
Live symphonic rock albums
Epic Records live albums
Epic Records video albums